Paul Dawson is an American actor, DJ, and writer.  In the 2006 comedy-drama film Shortbus, written and directed by John Cameron Mitchell, he played the secretly suicidal former prostitute James.

Career

Shortbus
The film Shortbus is noted for its explicit depiction of sexual activity, and, though Dawson is featured in one of the film's most graphic scenes, it was his portrayal of depression that garnered the critics' attention.  "Dawson's James haunts," said David Ansen of Newsweek, "the bitter taste of his despair feels real;" and a reviewer for TV Guide said that James and Jamie (played by PJ DeBoy) were perhaps the "most adorable gay couple ever."

Other film credits
In 1999, Dawson played Tar in The Blur of Insanity, an underground comedy written and directed by John Hussar about partying and drug use in college.  The following year, he played a bellboy in The Big Kahuna, which starred Kevin Spacey and Danny DeVito.  Also in 2000, Dawson appeared as the Bloodied Man in Urbania, an independent drama based on the play Urban Folk Tales. Urbania premiered at the 2000 Sundance Film Festival and was seen at a number of LGBT film festivals.  That same year Dawson played a hustler in "The Mountain King," a short film included in the 2001 LGBT-themed anthology Boys to Men.

Television credits
In 1999, Dawson appeared in the pilot episode of Strangers with Candy, "Old Habits – New Beginnings," and was also featured as "Derek Harland" in the Law & Order episode "Hate".

"Mattachine"
Dawson is the graphic designer and a disc jockey for international "Mattachine" dance parties, which he co-founded in New York City in 2008.

References

External links

 

American male film actors
American male television actors
American gay actors
Place of birth missing (living people)
Year of birth missing (living people)
Living people
Radical Faeries members
Sundance Film Festival